Chrysoritis aureus, the Heidelberg copper or golden opal, is a species of butterfly in the family Lycaenidae. It is endemic to South Africa, where it is found in montane grassland in Gauteng and Mpumalanga provinces.

The wingspan is 24–28 mm for males and 28–32 mm for females. Adults are on wing year-round with peaks in December and March.

The larvae feed on Clutia pulchella varieties. They are attended to by Crematogaster liengmei ants.

References

External links 

Chrysoritis
Butterflies described in 1966
Endemic butterflies of South Africa
Taxonomy articles created by Polbot